"Raggamuffin" is a song performed by Belgian musician and songwriter Selah Sue from her self-titled debut album Selah Sue. It was released on 7 June 2010 as a digital download in Belgium and re-released on 22 October 2010.

Background
The song was originally released on Selah Sue's 2010 EP of the same name. The original version also contained a sample of the Rascalz song "Top of the World".

Music video
A music video to accompany the release of "Raggamuffin" was first released onto YouTube on 27 September 2010, at a total length of two minutes and thirty-seven seconds.

Track listing

Credits and personnel
Lead vocals – Selah Sue
Producers – Patrice
Lyrics – Sanne Putseys
Label: Because Music

Chart performance

Certifications

Release history

References

2010 debut singles
Selah Sue songs
Songs written by Selah Sue
2010 songs
Because Music singles